The Citizen Cyberscience Centre (CCC) is an organization for volunteer computing formed as a partnership between CERN, UNITAR, and the University of Geneva.

In August 2011, a new version of the BOINC-based volunteer computing project LHC@home began simulating the high-energy collisions of protons in CERN's Large Hadron Collider (LHC), with CCC's help.

The Citizen Cyberscience Centre is currently hosted at the UNITAR offices at CERN.

References

External links
 Official website

Information technology organizations based in Europe
Supercomputing